This article contains a list of all Major League Baseball managers with at least 1,000 career regular season wins and a list of managers who have regular season win percentages of at least .540 in at least 450 games (approximately three full seasons). Both lists are current through the close of the 2022 Major League Baseball season.

Connie Mack is the all-time leader in wins (3,731) and losses (3,948). Dusty Baker is the active wins leader (2,093) and is ninth in overall wins.

Managers with 1,000 or more wins

Win percentage
Managers included have managed at least 450 gamesslightly less than three full seasons and a group including 296 managersand regular season win percentages of at least .540. 
Note that the total number of games listed for each manager in this table includes tie games though ties are not included in "decided game" statistics. The lowest winning percentage for a qualifying manager is Doc Prothro: .301 (138–320–2) in 460 games.

The following active managers have winning percentages above .540, but have not reached 450 managed games.

See also

MLB All-Time Manager (1997; BBWAA)
Sporting News Manager of the Decade (2009)
Sports Illustrated MLB Manager of the Decade (2009)
Manager of the Year
The Sporting News Manager of the Year Award
This Year in Baseball Awards (including manager)

References

Managers
Wins
Managers